Saint Petersburg Mint is one of the world's largest mints. It was founded by Peter the Great in 1724 on the territory of Peter and Paul Fortress, so it is one of the oldest industrial enterprises in Saint Petersburg.

It is a part of the Goznak state-owned corporation.

External links
 Шишанов В. А. К истории создания Банковского монетного двора // Хранитель Эрмитажа: Сборник воспоминаний и научных статей к 100-летию со дня рождения И. Г. Спасского. СПб.: Изд-во Гос. Эрмитажа, 2004. С.221-228

  Official site

Buildings and structures in Saint Petersburg
Mints (currency)
1724 establishments in the Russian Empire
18th century in Saint Petersburg
Cultural heritage monuments of federal significance in Saint Petersburg
Peter and Paul Fortress